4B (or "Four No's") is a radical feminist movement originating in South Korea in 2019. Its members renounce four activities: 

 sex, 
 child-rearing, 
 dating, and 
 marriage with men. 

Jung Se-young and Baeck Ha-na, two proponents, criticize marriage as reinforcing gender roles in South Korea. The movement draws some amount of inspiration from the novel Kim Ji-young, Born 1982, as does South Korea's Me Too and "Escape the Corset" movements. The 4B movement claimed to have 4,000 members in 2019.

See also 

 6B4T movement

References

2019 in Internet culture
2019 in South Korea
2019 in women's history
Feminism in South Korea
Feminist movements and ideologies
Internet-based activism
Radical feminism